Triodos might refer to:
 Triodos, Messenia, a village in the municipality of Messini, Messenia, southern Greece
 Triodos Airport, near the village
 Triodos Bank which is a pioneer in ethical banking